The 2016 Armed Forces Bowl was a post-season American college football bowl game played on December 23, 2016 at Amon G. Carter Stadium in Fort Worth, Texas. The fourteenth annual edition of the Armed Forces Bowl was one of the 2016–17 bowl games that concluded the 2016 FBS football season and was sponsored by aerospace and defense company Lockheed Martin; it was officially known as the Lockheed Martin Armed Forces Bowl.

Team selection
The game featured the Louisiana Tech Bulldogs against the Navy Midshipmen.

This was the third meeting between the schools, with Navy winning both previous ones.  The most recent meeting was on September 18, 2010, where the Midshipmen defeated the Bulldogs by a score of 37–23.

Louisiana Tech

Navy

Game summary

Scoring summary

Statistics

References

2016–17 NCAA football bowl games
2016
2016 Armed Forces Bowl
2016 Armed Forces Bowl
December 2016 sports events in the United States
2016 in sports in Texas
2016 Armed Forces Bowl